The New Mexico Governor's Residence is the official residence of the governor of New Mexico and their family. The current structure, located at 1 Mansion Drive in Santa Fe, New Mexico, has served as the Governor's official residence since 1954. It is the third home to serve this function.

Prior to 1954, the Governor's Residence was located in downtown Santa Fe, adjacent to the New Mexico State Capitol. It featured neoclassical architecture and was meant to resemble the White House but was painted a light tan color. This home had expansive gardens and a fish pond. By 1950, however, the mansion was in severe disrepair and the New Mexico Legislature authorized funds for a new residence that same year.

Before the second home's construction, and dating back to the period of Spanish colonization, governors of New Mexico resided at the Palace of the Governors in Santa Fe. This adobe structure, constructed in 1610, remains standing today and is now a museum and tourist attraction. The palace is the oldest continuously occupied public building in the United States, having been in continuous use for over 400 years.

References 

Governors' mansions in the United States
Government buildings in New Mexico
Buildings and structures in Santa Fe, New Mexico
Houses in Santa Fe County, New Mexico
Tourist attractions in Santa Fe, New Mexico
Mansion